Vertyagino is a rural locality (a village) in Nikolskoye Rural Settlement, Kaduysky District, Vologda Oblast, Russia. The population was 13 as of 2002.

Geography 
Vertyagino is located 40 km north of Kaduy (the district's administrative centre) by road. Mikhalevo is the nearest rural locality.

References 

Rural localities in Kaduysky District